Alexander Baumann may refer to:

Alexander Baumann (aeronautical engineer) (1875–1928), German engineer
Alex Baumann (born 1964), Canadian athlete
Alex Baumann (bobsledder) (born 1985), Swiss bobsledder
Alexander Baumann (curler) (born 1984), German curler